Calvin Coolidge Hernton (April 28, 1932 — September 30, 2001) was an American sociologist, poet and author, particularly renowned for his 1965 study Sex and Racism in America, which has been described as "a frank look at the role sexual tensions played in the American racial divide, and it helped set the tone for much African-American social criticism over the following decade."

Biography

Hernton was born in Chattanooga, Tennessee, United States, on April 28, 1932. He studied at Talladega College in Alabama, where he received a B.A. in sociology (1954), and at Fisk University, where he earned a master's degree. In the mid-1950s, he worked as a social worker in New York City. He also gave poetry readings there and co-founded the magazine Umbra, which published a collective of Black writers including Langston Hughes, Ishmael Reed and Alice Walker. Hernton subsequently went to London and worked with the Institute of Phenomenological Studies (1965–69), studying under R. D. Laing. Hernton was active alongside Obi Egbuna, C. L. R. James and others in the Antiuniversity of London.

He returned to the US in 1970, and went to Oberlin College as a writer in residence and two years later joined the Black Studies department. He was a Professor of African-American Studies there until his retirement in 1999.

Hernton was the author of nine books that reflect his writings as a poet, novelist, essayist, playwright, and social scientist, including the bestselling Sex and Racism In America (1965), which was translated into several languages, and the ground-breaking The Sexual Mountain and Black Women Writers: Adventures in Sex, Literature, and Real Life (1987). His poems were also published in Essence, Evergreen Review and Black Scholar, among other places, and on various recordings and were performed in plays on Broadway and on tour.

In 2011 the Chelsea Art Museum recreated a performance of Black Zero, a happening staged by Aldo Tambellini at Group Center on several occasions between 1963 and 1965. Sound recordings of Hernton reciting his poetry were accompanied by improvised performances by Ben Morea and Henry Grimes.

Hernton died in Oberlin, Ohio, at the age of 69.

Bibliography

Fiction
 Scarecrow (novel; 1974)

Non-Fiction

 Sex and Racism in America (Doubleday, 1965)
 White Papers for White Americans (Doubleday, 1966)
 Coming Together: Black Power, White Hatred, and Sexual Hang-ups (Doubleday, 1971)
 (with Joseph Berke) The Cannabis Experience: An Interpretative Study of the Effects of Marijuana and Hashish (London: Peter Owen, 1974)
 The Sexual Mountain and Black Women Writers: Adventures in Sex, Literature, and Real Life (1987)

Poetry

 The Coming of Chronos to the House of Nightsong: An Epical Narrative of the South (Interim Books, 1964)
 Medicine Man: Collected Poems (Reed Cannon & Johnson Publishing, 1976)
 The Red Crab Gang and Black River Poems (Ishmael Reed Publishing Company, 1999)
Selected Poems (Wesleyan University Press, forthcoming, 2022)

Plays
 Glad to Be Dead (1958)
 Flame (1958)
 The Place (1972)
(These plays remain unpublished)
Contributions to Anthologies

 (Poetry) Rosey E. Pool, ed., Beyond the Blues: New Poems by American Negroes (Hand & Flower Press, 1962)
 (Poetry and essay) LeRoi Jones and Larry Neal, eds, Black Fire: An Anthology of Afro-American Writing (Morrow, 1969)

References

Further reading
 Tom Dent, ‘A Voice from a Tumultuous Time’ (review of Medicine Man), Obsidian, Vol.6 (Spring-Summer 1980), pp. 103–6.
David Grundy, A Black Arts Poetry Machine: Amiri Baraka and the Umbra Poets (London: Bloomsbury, 2019).
Michel Oren, "The Enigmatic Career of Hernton's Scarecrow", Callaloo, Volume 29, Number 2, Spring 2006, pp. 608–618.
Lauri Ramey, "Calvin Hernton: Portrait of a Poet", in Lauri Ramey (ed.), The Heritage Series of Black Poetry, 1962-1975: A Research Compendium (Aldershot: Ashgate, 2008).
Lorenzo Thomas, Extraordinary Measures: Afrocentric Modernism and Twentieth Century American Poetry (Tuscaloosa: University of Alabama Press, 2000), pp. 133–6.

External links
 
Margalit Fox, "Calvin Hernton, 69, Scholar Of American Race Relations" (obituary), The New York Times, October 10, 2001.
 "Medicine Man" by Calvin Hernton, African American Registry
 FBI file on Calvin Hernton at the Internet Archive

1932 births
2001 deaths
20th-century American novelists
20th-century American poets
African-American social scientists
African-American novelists
American male novelists
American sociologists
Fisk University alumni
Oberlin College faculty
People from Chattanooga, Tennessee
Talladega College alumni
American male poets
Academics from Tennessee
20th-century American male writers
Novelists from Ohio
Novelists from Tennessee
20th-century American non-fiction writers
American male non-fiction writers
African-American poets
20th-century African-American writers
African-American male writers